"Bobbie Ann Mason" is a song written by Mark D. Sanders, and recorded by American country music artist Rick Trevino.  It was released in May 1995 as the second single from the album Looking for the Light.  The song reached number 6 on both the Billboard Hot Country Singles & Tracks and the Canadian RPM Country Tracks chart.

Content
The song is an uptempo, in which the narrator discusses his high school crush, Bobbie Ann Mason. Songwriter Mark Sanders has written that he was inspired to choose the name "Bobbie Ann Mason" for the character in the song because he loved the books In Country and Shiloh and Other Stories by the novelist Bobbie Ann Mason. Sanders wrote that he later received a phone call from Mason, and commented, "It turned out that she was a little put off that I used her name in the song, but I think she got over that."

Critical reception
Deborah Evans Price, of Billboard magazine reviewed the song unfavorably saying that the song is "slick, safe and not very exciting at all."

Music video
The music video was directed by Martin Kahan and premiered in April 1995.

Personnel
Paul Franklin – steel guitar
John Jorgenson – electric guitar
Larry Marrs – bass guitar
Steve Nathan – piano
John Wesley Ryles – background vocals
Rick Trevino – lead vocals
Blaine Sprouse – fiddle
Steve Turner – drums
John Willis – acoustic guitar
Dennis Wilson – background vocals

Chart performance
"Bobbie Ann Mason" debuted at number 68 on the U.S. Billboard Hot Country Singles & Tracks for the week of May 6, 1995.

Year-end charts

References

1995 singles
1995 songs
Rick Trevino songs
Songs written by Mark D. Sanders
Song recordings produced by Steve Buckingham (record producer)
Song recordings produced by Blake Chancey
Columbia Records singles